Cryptanthus marginatus is a species in the genus Cryptanthus. This species is endemic to Brazil.

Cultivars
 Cryptanthus 'Arlety'
 Cryptanthus 'Atahualpa'
 Cryptanthus 'Beau Brummel'
 Cryptanthus 'Bivittatus-Grande'
 Cryptanthus 'Bivittatus-Lueddemanniana'
 Cryptanthus 'Bivittatus-Major'
 Cryptanthus 'Brown Soldier'
 Cryptanthus 'Burnt Offering'
 Cryptanthus 'Coffee Royal'
 Cryptanthus 'Covergirl'
 Cryptanthus 'Dark Fire'
 Cryptanthus 'Florence'
 Cryptanthus 'Green Lueddemannii'
 Cryptanthus 'Greyling'
 Cryptanthus 'Hurricane'
 Cryptanthus 'Hush'
 Cryptanthus 'Ingeborg Whitman'
 Cryptanthus 'Jeanie'
 Cryptanthus 'Juan 'N Only'
 Cryptanthus 'Lime 'N Tan'
 Cryptanthus 'Lueddemannii'
 Cryptanthus 'Major'
 Cryptanthus 'Mamma Mia'
 Cryptanthus 'Muriel Loose'
 Cryptanthus 'Paleface'
 Cryptanthus 'Rube'
 Cryptanthus 'Rubra'
 Cryptanthus 'Scotch Mist'
 Cryptanthus 'Soerries'
 Cryptanthus 'Spot Light'
 Cryptanthus 'Stars and Stripes'
 Cryptanthus 'Texas'
 Cryptanthus 'Tropiflora'
 Cryptanthus 'Yay'
 xCryptbergia 'Resplendent'
 xCryptbergia 'Tiger Eye'

References

BSI Cultivar Registry Retrieved 11 October 2009

marginatus
Flora of Brazil